The discography of Christian hip-hop artist Derek Minor, formerly known as PRo, consists of five studio albums and seven mixtapes as a solo artist, one studio album each with the groups R.M.G. and 116 Clique, twenty-three singles, including eight as a featured artist and three with R.M.G. and one with 116 Clique, and eleven music videos, including two as a featured artist and one each with R.M.G. and 116 Clique.

Albums

Studio albums

"—" denotes releases that did not chart.

With 116 Clique

With R.M.G.

Mixtapes

Collaborative albums

EPs

Singles

As lead artist

Other charted songs

As featured performer

With 116 Clique

With R.M.G.

Guest appearances

Music videos

As lead artist

As featured artist

With 116 Clique

With R.M.G.

References

Minor, Derek